Robert Nicol Smith Anderson (26 February 1897 – 1974) was a Scottish footballer who made 238 appearances in the Football League playing for Luton Town, Newport County and Lincoln City. He played as a right back.

References

1897 births
1974 deaths
Footballers from North Ayrshire
Scottish footballers
Association football fullbacks
Ardrossan Winton Rovers F.C. players
Luton Town F.C. players
Newport County A.F.C. players
Lincoln City F.C. players
English Football League players
Place of death missing
People from Ardrossan